Syringodermataceae is a family of brown algae. It includes two genera, Microzonia and Syringoderma.

References

Brown algae
Brown algae families